Tu Tongjin (Chinese: 涂通今, born 1914) is a Chinese military officer and neurosurgeon.

Biography
Tu joined the CCP in 1933 and became a founding major general of PLA in 1964. He later served as the President of Chinese Military Medical Academy.

References

1914 births
Living people
Chinese centenarians
Men centenarians